Miranda railway station is located on the Cronulla line, serving the Sydney suburb of Miranda. It is served by Sydney Trains T4 line services.

History
Miranda station opened on 16 December 1939 when the Cronulla line opened from Sutherland to Cronulla. It initially had a goods siding.

On 15 July 1985, the line between Gymea and Caringbah was duplicated with a new track laid north of the existing single line, with the platform converted to an island platform.

By January 2005, an upgrade to the station including a lift was complete.

In 2014, new station canopies were installed on the station platform.

Platforms & services

Transport links

Maianbar Bundeena Bus Service operates one route from Miranda station:
989: to Bundeena via Maianbar (Friday only)

Transdev NSW operates 15 routes via Miranda station::
961: to Barden Ridge
962: to 
967: to Como West 
968: to Bonnet Bay
969: to Sutherland station
970: to Hurstville via Sylvania Heights
971: Hurstville to Cronulla via Southgate
972: to Southgate
973: to Yowie Bay
974: to Gymea Bay
975: to Grays Point
977: to Lilli Pilli
978: to Port Hacking
986: to Miranda North (Parraweena Road)
993: to Woronora Heights

Transit Systems operates two routes from Miranda station:
477: to Rockdale station via Sans Souci & Kogarah
478: to Rockdale station via Dolls Point & Brighton-Le-Sands (limited weekday off peak service)

References

External links

Miranda station details Transport for New South Wales

Easy Access railway stations in Sydney
Railway stations in Sydney
Railway stations in Australia opened in 1939
Cronulla railway line
Sutherland Shire